Tertiary Education Commission may refer to: 

 Tertiary Education Commission, New Zealand, which directs tertiary education in New Zealand
The former Tertiary Education Commission, Mauritius; restructured in 2020 as the Higher Education Commission and Quality Assurance Authority, which direct tertiary education in Mauritius 

Higher education authorities